Alfredo Martínez Moreno (1 September 1923 – 2 October 2021) was a Salvadoran diplomat, lawyer and jurist, president of the Supreme Court of El Salvador in 1968 and director of the Academia Salvadoreña de la Lengua between 1969 and 2006. In 1967 he was also Minister of Foreign Affairs.

References 

1923 births
2021 deaths
20th-century Salvadoran lawyers
Salvadoran diplomats
Recipients of the Order of Merit of the Federal Republic of Germany
Recipients of the Order of the Sun of Peru
Order of the Quetzal